Bryan Collins is an American football coach who currently serves as the defensive coordinator for Stony Brook University. He previously served as the head coach of the LIU Sharks, representing Long Island University. He became the head coach of the LIU Post Pioneers, which represented the university's Post campus, in 1998. While LIU then operated two athletic programs—the LIU Brooklyn Blackbirds and LIU Post Pioneers—only the Post campus had a football team, a situation which continued throughout Collins' career at LIU Post. After the 2018 season, LIU merged its two athletic programs into the current LIU Sharks, with Collins remaining as head coach of the Sharks. Collins stepped down in 2021.

Head coaching record

References

External links
 Stony Brook profile
 LIU profile

Year of birth missing (living people)
Living people
American football linebackers
LIU Sharks football coaches
LIU Post Pioneers football coaches
Merchant Marine Mariners football coaches
St. John's Red Storm football players
Stony Brook Seawolves football coaches